Gamochaetopsis is a genus of flowering plants in the daisy family.

Species
There is only one known species, Gamochaetopsis alpina, native to Chile (Biobío, La Araucania, Los Lagos) and Argentina (Neuquén, Rio Negro).

References

Monotypic Asteraceae genera
Gnaphalieae
Flora of South America